Transitplus was a privately owned public transport company which operated bus services from the South Australian capital Adelaide, to the Adelaide Hills, mainly Mount Barker area. It is part of the Adelaide Metro network. It was a joint venture between TransAdelaide, which also operates the train system in Adelaide and Australian Transit Enterprises. Transitplus was based in Aldgate in the Adelaide Hills and had two depots located in Aldgate and Mount Barker.  

Australian Transit Enterprises trading as Southlink took over Transitplus' services in 2010.

Service Areas
Transitplus serviced the following towns in the Adelaide Hills and suburbs of Adelaide up until 2010:

Aldgate, Balhannah, Blakiston, Bridgewater, Bugle Ranges, Carey Gulley, Cleland, Charleston, Crafers, Eagle on the Hill, Eastwood, Echunga, Flaxley, Frewville, Gemmels, Glen Osmond, Glenalta, Glenside, Green Hill Ranges, Green Hill, Hahndorf, Hawthorndene, Heathfield, Leawood Gardens, Littlehampton, Lobethal, Macclesfield, Meadows, Mount Barker, Mount George, Mount Osmond, Murray Bridge, Mylor, Myrtle Bank, Nairne, Oakbank, Parkside, Piccadilly, Stirling, Strathalbyn, Summertown, Upper Sturt, Uraildla, Urrbrae, Verdun, Woodside.

Routes

Transitplus operated bus routes in the Adelaide Hills were:

820	:	Carey Gully to Burnside Village and Adelaide (Currie Street Bus Terminal)
821	:	Aldgate to Burnside Village and Adelaide (Currie Street Bus Terminal)
823	:	Crafers to Cleland Wildlife Park via Mount Lofty
830	:	Lobethal to Adelaide (Currie Street Bus Terminal)
834	:	Lobethal to Verdun Junction
835	:	Lobethal to Mount Barker
837	:	Nairne to Mount Barker
838	:	Mount Barker City Loop (East)
839	:	Mount Barker City Loop (West)
840	:	Mount Barker to Adelaide (Currie Street Bus Terminal)
841	:	Nairne to Adelaide (Currie Street Bus Terminal) via Littlehampton
842	:	Nairne to Adelaide (Currie Street Bus Terminal) via Mount Barker
850	:	Aldgate to Macclesfield
852	:	Mount Barker to Strathalbyn
853	:	Mount Barker to Langhorne Creek
861	:	Glen Osmond to Adelaide (Currie Street Bus Terminal)
863	:	Aldgate to Adelaide (Currie Street Bus Terminal)
864	:	Mount Barker to Adelaide (Currie Street Bus Terminal)
865	:	Aldgate to Adelaide (Currie Street Bus Terminal) via Pomona Road
866	:	Aldgate to Crafers
868	:	Aldgate to Stirling
892	:	Urrbrae to Aldgate via Belair
893	:	Aldgate to Blackwood Station
894	:	Aldgate to Blackwood Station

All the services operated by Transitplus to Adelaide City, terminated at Currie Street bus terminal.

Fleet
Amongst the bus companies in Adelaide, Transitplus operated newer and well maintained buses. Its fleet included:

Scania L94UA 6x2 16.5m
Scania L94UB 6x2 14.5m
Scania L94UB 4x2 12.5m
MAN SG280H 16.5m
Volvo B10M 12.5m
Volvo B10M 16.5m
Mitsubishi Rosa

All of its buses were fully Air-conditioned.

Depots
Transitplus operated out of its main depot in Aldgate, South Australia and sub depot/Park and Ride in Mount Barker, South Australia.

See also
TransAdelaide
SouthLink
Torrens Transit

References

External links
Transitplus

Transport in Adelaide
Defunct bus companies of Australia

Adelaide Metro